Sitaram Panchal (1963 – 10 August 2017, Mumbai) was an Indian actor known for his roles in Slumdog Millionaire (2008), Peepli Live (2010), The Legend of Bhagat Singh (2002) and Jolly LLB 2 (2017).

Death 
He was suffering from kidney and lung cancer. Haryana Government gave ₹5 lakh in financial help to the actor. CINTAA have also put out a plea to gather help for Panchal. He died on 10 August 2017.

Filmography 
 Bandit Queen (1995)
 Lajja (2001)
 Shakti: The Power (2002)
 The Legend of Bhagat Singh (2002)
 Peepli Live (2010)
 Halla Bol (2008)
 Slumdog Millionaire (2008)
 Sau Jhooth Ek Sach (2010)
 10ml LOVE (2010)
 Shagird (2011)
 Saheb, Biwi Aur Gangster (2011)
 Saheb, Biwi Aur Gangster Returns (2011)
 Yeh Khula Aasmaan (2012)
 Ammaa Ki Boli (2012)
 Paan Singh Tomar (2012)
 Saare Jahaan Se Mehnga (2013)
 Ammaa Ki Boli (2013)
 Bumper Draw (2015)
 Rebellious Flower (2016)
 Bhouri (2016)
 Jolly LLB 2  (2017)
 Ekkees Tareekh Shubh Muhurat (2018)
 Game Paisa Ladki (2018)

 Television 
 Looteri Dulhan (2011)
 Ek Ghar Banaunga (2014)
 Office Office as Gowardhan'' (1999)

References

External links
 

1960s births
2017 deaths
Indian male film actors
Male actors in Hindi cinema
20th-century Indian male actors
21st-century Indian male actors
Deaths from kidney cancer
Deaths from lung cancer in India